Babita Kumari is a Nepalese politician. She is a member of Provincial Assembly of Madhesh Province from Loktantrik Samajwadi Party, Nepal. Kumari is a resident of Jaleshwar, Mahottari.

References

Living people
1975 births
21st-century Nepalese women politicians
21st-century Nepalese politicians
Members of the Provincial Assembly of Madhesh Province
Loktantrik Samajwadi Party, Nepal politicians